Thomas Callum "Tom" Sorsby  (born 28 October 1996) is an English field hockey player who plays as a midfielder or defender for Surbiton and the England and Great Britain national teams.

Club career
Sorsby plays club hockey in the Men's England Hockey League Premier Division for Surbiton.

He joined Surbiton for the 2018–19 season, from the University of Nottingham. He has also played for Beeston and Sheffield Hallam

International career
Sorsby has played for England under-18 and under-21 level and for Great Britain under-21 and under-23. He played for England under-21 in the Sultan of Johor Cup in 2016, when they finished 4th. He played for Great Britain under-21 in the Sultan of Johor Cup in 2017, when they finished 2nd.

References

External links
Profile on England Hockey
Profile on Great Britain Hockey

1996 births
Living people
English male field hockey players
Male field hockey defenders
Male field hockey midfielders
Surbiton Hockey Club players
Men's England Hockey League players
Beeston Hockey Club players
Field hockey players at the 2020 Summer Olympics
Olympic field hockey players of Great Britain
2023 Men's FIH Hockey World Cup players